PSG.LGD is a professional Dota 2 team based in China. They were formed as a partnership between PSG Esports and LGD Gaming in April 2018. PSG.LGD has finished as the runner-up in The International 2018 and 2021.

History 
The original Dota 2 division of the Chinese-based esports organization LGD Gaming was founded in 2009. The team had varying degrees of success, participating in and winning multiple tournaments and events over a nine-year span. In April 2018, French football club Paris Saint-Germain F.C. invested in the organization, sponsoring and rebranding the Dota 2 team as PSG.LGD. The team found instant success by winning two Majors of the 2017-2018 Dota Pro Circuit, which helped them secure a direct invite to The International 2018. There, they advanced to the grand finals but lost against OG again in five games.

Following that, the roster remained together for the next season, where they received a direct invite to The International 2019 after securing a top 12 finish in that year's Dota Pro Circuit rankings. The team was placed in Group A, finishing with a 13–3 record which guaranteed a place in the upper bracket. There, the team defeated Virtus.pro and Vici Gaming before losing once again to OG in the upper bracket grand final. The team was placed in the lower bracket final against Team Liquid, losing the series 2–1 to earn them 3rd place and therefore a total of $3,089,706.

After that loss, the team went through various changes, with notable members Xu "fy" Linsen and Lu "Maybe" Yao leaving the organization in September 2020, while Yang "Chalice" Shenyi and Yap "xNova" Jian Wei were transferred to EHOME later that month. To replace them, the team signed former member Wang "Ame" Chunyu, Cheng "NothingToSay" Jin Xiang, Zhao "XinQ" Zixing, along with Zhang "Faith_bian" Ruida and Zhang "y`" Yiping, who won The International 2016 with Wings Gaming. The team found immediate success by winning the WePlay AniMajor against Evil Geniuses 3–0.

The team continued with their strong form during The International 2021, going 15–1 in the group stage to advance to the upper bracket. There, the team won every series to advance to the grand finals by defeating T1, Virtus.pro and Team Secret but ultimately falling to Team Spirit in the best-of-five series 3–2, after nearly staging a reverse-sweep.

Roster

References

External links 

 

2018 establishments in China
Dota teams
Esports teams based in China
Esports teams established in 2018
Sports teams in Shanghai
Paris Saint-Germain F.C.